Brebeni is a commune in Olt County, Muntenia, Romania. It is composed of two villages, Brebeni and Teiușu.

References

Communes in Olt County
Localities in Muntenia